In physics and the philosophy of science, instant refers to an infinitesimal interval in time, whose passage is instantaneous.  In ordinary speech, an instant has been defined as "a point or very short space of time," a notion deriving from its etymological source, the Latin verb instare, from in- + stare ('to stand'), meaning 'to stand upon or near.'

The continuous nature of time and its infinite divisibility was addressed by Aristotle in his Physics, where he wrote on Zeno's paradoxes. The philosopher and mathematician Bertrand Russell was still seeking to define the exact nature of an instant thousands of years later.

, the smallest time interval certify in regulated measurements is on the order of 397 zeptoseconds (397 × 10−21 seconds).

See also
 Infinitesimal
 Present

References

Time